{{DISPLAYTITLE:L-Aspartic-4-semialdehyde}}

L-Aspartic-4-semialdehyde (also L-aspartate-4-semialdehyde) is an α-amino acid derivative of aspartate. It is an important intermediate in the aspartate pathway, which is a metabolic pathway present in bacteria and plants. The aspartate pathway leads to the biosynthesis of a variety of amino acids from aspartate, including lysine, methionine, and threonine.

Aspartate pathway

The aspartate pathway is an amino acid metabolic pathway present in bacteria and plants that deal with converting aspartate to other amino acids through a series of reactions and intermediates. L-Aspartate-4-semialdehyde serves as one of the first intermediates in the pathway and as an important step of differentiation in the pathway.

L-Aspartate-4-semialdehyde is synthesized by the enzyme aspartate semialdehyde dehydrogenase, which catalyzes the following reversible chemical reaction:
L-4-Aspartyl phosphate + NADPH + H+  L-aspartate-4-semialdehyde + NADP+ + phosphate

Once  L-aspartate-4-semialdehyde is synthesized, the molecule can then progress down a number of pathways. One possible pathway requires L-aspartate-4-semialdehyde to undergo a reaction catalyzed by the enzyme dihydropicolinate synthase in order to form the molecule dihydrodipicolinate. This reversible chemical reaction is shown below:
L-Aspartate-4-semialdehyde + pyruvate  dihydrodipicolinate + H2O

Once dihydrodipicolinate is synthesized, it can continue down the metabolic pathway leading to the synthesis of lysine. Other than the lysine biosynthetic pathway, L-aspartate-4-semialdehyde can also undergo a reversible reaction catalyzed by the enzyme homoserine dehydrogenase. This reaction, which turns L-aspartate-4-semialdehyde into homoserine is shown below:
L-Aspartate-4-semialdehyde + NAD(P)H + H+  homoserine + NAD(P)+

Homoserine represents another branch in the aspartate pathway, as it can progress down one of two pathways to eventually become one of two amino acids: threonine or methionine. This aspartate pathway is present in plants and bacteria, allowing them to synthesize lysine, methionine, and threonine. This pathway is not present in humans or other animals, however. The lack of this pathway means that humans need to take in these amino acids through their diet, which is why they are called essential amino acids.

References 

Amino acids
Aldehydic acids